Iyad may refer to:
Iyad (tribe), Arab tribe, 3rd–7th centuries
Iyad Jamal Al-Din (born 1961), prominent Iraqi intellectual, politician and religious cleric
Iyad Al-Khatib, Jordanian football player
Abdallah Iyad Barghouti (born 1979), Palestinian leading commander in Hamas' armed wing in the West Bank
Iyad Burnat (born 1973), leads Bil'in's non-violent struggle in the West Bank
Iyad Ag Ghaly, Tuareg militant from Mali's Kidal Region
Iyad ibn Ghanm (died 641), Arab general important in the Muslim conquests of al-Jazira and northern Syria
Iyad Abu Gharqoud (born 1988), Palestinian professional footballer
Iyad Issimaila (born 1987), French-born Comorian footballer who has two caps for the Comoros national football team
Abu Ali Iyad (8206–1971), senior Palestinian field commander based in Syria and Jordan during the 1960s and early 1970s
Abu Iyad (Salah Khalaf) (1933–1991), deputy chief and head of intelligence for the Palestine Liberation Organization
İyad el-Baghdadi (born 1977), writer, entrepreneur, and human rights activist, gained international prominence during the Arab Spring
Iyad bin Amin Madani (born 1946), Saudi public figure who served in different cabinet posts
Iyad Mando (born 1978), Syrian footballer
Iyad Rahwan, Syrian-Australian scientist
Iyad Sughayer (born 1993), Jordanian-Palestinian classical pianist
Iyad Khalil Zaki, Iraqi Army General

See also
Eyad

Arabic masculine given names